Garrettia is a genus of flowering plant in the family Lamiaceae, first described in 1937. It contains only one known species, Garrettia siamensis. It is native to southern China (Yunnan Province), Java, Thailand.

References

Lamiaceae
Flora of Java
Flora of Thailand
Flora of Yunnan
Monotypic Lamiaceae genera